Dmitriy Vladimirovich Dyachenko (born September 16, 1972) is a Russian director, producer and screenwriter. He is best known for his comedy movies starring Kvartet I that became box office hits in Russia.

Filmography

As director
 Radio Day (2008)
 Big Difference (2008)
 What Men Talk About (2010)
 What Men Still Talk About (2011)
 Kitchen (2012)
 Faster Than Rabbits (2014)
 The Kitchen in Paris (2014)
 Wonderland (2016)
 Super Bobrovs (2015) 
 The Last Warrior (2017)
 The Last Warrior: Root of Evil (2021)
 The Last Warrior 3 (2021)
 Cheburashka (2023)

As producer
 Kitchen (2012)
 Bystree, chem kroliki (2014)
 The Kitchen in Paris (2014)
 Super Bobrovs (2015) 
 Otel Eleon (2016)

References

External links

1972 births
Living people
Russian film directors